An artificial iris is a surgically implanted device to treat damage or absence of the iris of the eye.

In 2018, the United States Food and Drug Administration approved the first artificial iris, CustomFlex Artificial Iris developed and produced by HumanOptics Holding AG, made of medical grade silicone.

The device improves vision by controlling the amount of light let into the eye. It also improves cosmetic appearance.  There are a number of surgical techniques for implanting the prosthetic.

References 

Prosthetics
Implants (medicine)